The Gonzaga–Washington's men's basketball rivalry is a cross-state college basketball rivalry between the Gonzaga Bulldogs men's basketball team of Gonzaga University in Spokane, Washington and the Washington Huskies team of University of Washington in Seattle, Washington.

Series overview 
Gonzaga and Washington have met a total of 49 times dating back to 1910 and have met annually since 2015. The Huskies dominated the series up until the end of the 20th century, but Gonzaga has won 13 of the last 14 meetings, dating back to 1998. The Huskies hold a 18–7 lead in Seattle, Gonzaga leads the series 12–11 in Spokane, and the Zags own a 1–0 record in neutral locations, but they have never met in any postseason tournaments.

Hiatus 
Washington and Gonzaga met 11 times between 1995 and 2006, including a true home-and-home series annually from 1997 until 2006, but then Washington cancelled the series. Gonzaga was dominating the series, ascending from a Cinderalla in the 1999 NCAA Tournament to regular in the top 25 polls and the NCAA Tournament every year. Bad blood surfaced between the schools with Huskies assistant coach Cameron Dollar breaking NCAA rules while recruiting Josh Heytvelt, who ended up signing with the Zags. In 2009, Lorenzo Romar and his Washington staff proposed a series three games in a row at KeyArena in Seattle, but Gonzaga head coach Mark Few took insult to that, retorting with "the chances of that happening are about the same as Bigfoot having my baby. That's like me saying, Gonzaga proposes a five-year deal at Spokane Arena. There, I just made a proposal. That's as logical as this deal [would be]."

Renewal 
In 2014, Washington State Senator Michael Baumgartner proposed a bill that would require Gonzaga and Washington to play once a year in men's basketball. Later in the year, it was announced that the dormant rivalry between the Huskies and the Bulldogs would be renewed with a 4-year home-and-home series beginning in the 2016–17 season and running through the 2019–20 season. A year later, with Gonzaga and Washington both among the field of the 2015 Battle 4 Atlantis Thanksgiving week basketball tournament, they were selected to play each other in the opening round of the tournament, ending the rivalry drought at 9 years. In 2019, The Zags and Huskies extended their home-and-home series from the 2020–21 season through the 2023–24 season, starting in Spokane.

Game results 
Below is a complete list of series results, according to Sports Reference and GoHuskies.com. Rankings are from the AP Poll at the time of the game.
 Gonzaga wins are in █ red, Washington wins are in █ purple.

References 

College basketball rivalries in the United States
Gonzaga Bulldogs men's basketball
Washington Huskies men's basketball
1910 establishments in Washington (state)